Various polling organizations have been conducting opinion polling in specific ridings in the lead up to the 2021 Canadian federal election. The results of publicized opinion polling for individual constituencies are detailed in this article.

Given the expense of polling individual constituencies, constituencies are usually only polled if they are of some particular interest, e.g. they are thought to be marginal or facing an impending by-election. The constituencies polled are not necessarily representative of a national average swing. Under the first-past-the-post electoral system the true marginal seats, by definition, will be decisive as to the outcome of the election.

Constituency polls

Alberta

Banff—Airdrie

Calgary Skyview

Edmonton Centre

Edmonton Griesbach

Edmonton Mill Woods

British Columbia

Burnaby North—Seymour

Cloverdale—Langley City

Delta

Nanaimo—Ladysmith

Pitt Meadows—Maple Ridge

Port Moody—Coquitlam

Surrey Centre

Vancouver Granville

Vancouver South

West Vancouver—Sunshine Coast—Sea to Sky Country

Manitoba

Charleswood—St. James—Assiniboia—Headingley

Kildonan—St. Paul

Winnipeg South

Newfoundland and Labrador

Bonavista—Burin—Trinity

St. John’s East

New Brunswick

Fredericton

Saint John—Rothesay

Nova Scotia

Cape Breton—Canso

Sydney—Victoria

West Nova

Ontario

Aurora—Oak Ridges—Richmond Hill

Davenport

Elgin—Middlesex—London

Flamborough—Glanbrook

Hamilton East—Stoney Creek

Kanata—Carleton

King—Vaughan

Kitchener Centre

Niagara Centre

Oakville

Ottawa Centre

Parkdale—High Park

Peterborough—Kawartha

Spadina—Fort York

St. Catharines

Toronto Centre

Windsor—Tecumseh

Prince Edward Island

Malpeque

Quebec

Abitibi—Témiscamingue

Beauport—Limoilou

Berthier—Maskinongé

Châteauguay—Lacolle

Jonquière

La Prairie

Longueuil—Saint-Hubert

Pontiac

Rivière-des-Mille-Îles

Shefford

Thérèse-De Blainville

Trois-Rivières

Saskatchewan

Saskatoon West

Notes
Notes
 In cases when linked poll details distinguish between the margin of error associated with the total sample of respondents (including undecided and non-voters) and that of the subsample of decided/leaning voters, the latter is included in the table.  Also not included is the margin of error created by rounding to the nearest whole number or any margin of error from methodological sources. Most online polls—because of their opt-in method of recruiting panellists which results in a non-random sample—cannot have a margin of error. In such cases, shown is what the margin of error would be for a survey using a random probability-based sample of equivalent size.
 Refers to the total sample size, including undecided and non-voters.
 "Telephone" refers to traditional telephone polls conducted by live interviewers; "IVR" refers to automated Interactive Voice Response polls conducted by telephone; "online" refers to polls conducted exclusively over the internet; "telephone/online" refers to polls which combine results from both telephone and online surveys, or for which respondents are initially recruited by telephone and then asked to complete an online survey.

See also
Opinion polling for the 2019 Canadian federal election by constituency
Opinion polling for the 2021 Canadian federal election

References 

Opinion polling in Canada